Shrewsbury and Atcham was a local government district with borough status in Shropshire, England, between 1974 and 2009.

Shrewsbury was the only town in the borough; Atcham, although itself only a village, was included in the name as a reflection of the incorporation into the borough of the former Atcham Rural District. Other notable villages included Alberbury, Bayston Hill, Bomere Heath, Condover, Cressage, Cross Houses, Dorrington, Ford, Hanwood, Minsterley, Montford Bridge, Nesscliffe, Pontesbury, Uffington and Westbury.

The Borough of Shrewsbury and Atcham covered , which was 19% of the non-metropolitan county of Shropshire. To the north of the borough was the North Shropshire district and the Borough of Oswestry and to the south were the South Shropshire and Bridgnorth districts. The borough lay in the middle of Shropshire and on the border with Wales. A 2006 estimate put the population of the borough at 95,900 (this accounted for approx 40% of the total population for the non-metropolitan county).

The district and its council was abolished on 1 April 2009 when the new Shropshire unitary authority was established, as part of the 2009 structural changes to local government in England.

History
The borough was formed on 1 April 1974, under the Local Government Act 1972 covering the area of the two former districts of the municipal borough of Shrewsbury and the Atcham Rural District, to form a new non-metropolitan district. The new district was initially called "Shrewsbury", but was renamed Shrewsbury and Atcham on 12 June 1974 by the new council. The district was awarded borough status from its creation, allowing the chairman of the council to take the title of mayor.

The borough unsuccessfully applied for city status in the 2000 and 2002 competitions.

The borough and its council were abolished on 31 March 2009, with the area becoming part of the new Shropshire Council unitary authority from 1 April 2009, as part of the 2009 structural changes to local government in England. The Central area committee of the new Shropshire Council covers exactly the same area as the borough did. The population for this area was 102,383 in 2011.

Population

Headquarters 

In the 19th century the headquarters of the borough council were at the Old Guildhall in the Market Square in Shrewsbury. The council moved to Newport House in Dogpole in 1917 and then to modern building on Frankwell Quay in Frankwell in March 2004. After Shrewsbury and Atcham Borough Council was abolished in 2009, it became surplus to requirements and was converted for use by the University Centre Shrewsbury.

Property 

The borough council owned much land and property in the Shrewsbury and Atcham area. Shrewsbury Castle was owned by the borough council, as was the town museum and art gallery, which is located in the 'Rowley's House' building.  The council also owned various car parks, offices, some public conveniences, large areas of parkland and a number of the town's bridges. Ownersrship of two main entertainment venues was also held by the council: The Music Hall, which holds the town theatre, its tourist information centre and a cafe, and The Old Market Hall, which was recently renovated to house a small cinema and cafe. The Bear Steps buildings were also owned by the council, although they are occupied by the town's civic society. The council once owned the Clive House Museum, but this was sold off and is now no longer a museum.

The borough council's housing stock was sold off in 2001 to a private social housing company, Severnside. The council earned some £60 million from this sale and this money has been used in part to buy and build their new Guildhall, build the new sports facilities at Sundorne and other large projects around the town, which were either under way or proposed when the borough council ceased to exist.

Parishes 
The rural part of the borough (the pre-1974 Atcham Rural District) was always parished but the urban part of the borough (the pre-1974 municipal borough of Shrewsbury) was an unparished area. A town council for Shrewsbury was established on 1 April 2009, being the same day that the new Shropshire unitary authority took over from the old Shrewsbury and Atcham Borough Council.

Mayors 

There has been a continuous succession of Mayors of Shrewsbury since 1638. In 1974, after the local government re-organisation, the style changed to "Mayor of Shrewsbury and Atcham Borough", and any Shrewsbury and Atcham borough councillor could be appointed to the post; they did not have to represent Shrewsbury itself. The last mayor of Shrewsbury and Atcham was Anne Chebsey. Since the abolition of the borough of Shrewsbury and Atcham in 2009, the mayor of Shrewsbury has been the chairman of the new Shrewsbury Town Council, a parish-level authority.

Political control
The first elections to the enlarged council were held in 1973, initially operating as a shadow authority until the new arrangements came into effect on 1 April 1974. Political control of the council from 1974 until its abolition in 2009 was held by the following parties:

Leadership
The last leader of the council was Peter Nutting, a Conservative.

Council elections
Elections were generally held three years out of every four, with a third of the council elected each time.

1973
1976 (New ward boundaries)
1978
1978
1980
1982
1983
1984
1986 (Borough boundary changes took place but the number of seats remained the same)
1987 (Borough boundary changes took place but the number of seats remained the same)
1988 (Borough boundary changes took place but the number of seats remained the same)
1990
1991
1992
1994
1995
1996
1998
1999
2000
2002 (New ward boundaries)
2003
2004
2006
2007

By-election results

External links
Official website
List of all Mayors of Shrewsbury and Mayors of Shrewsbury and Atcham Borough
List of borough councillors
Parishes of Shrewsbury and Atcham

References

 
Districts of England established in 1974
English districts abolished in 2009
Former non-metropolitan districts of Shropshire
Former boroughs in England
Council elections in Shropshire
District council elections in England